Jean Bricmont (born 12 April 1952) is a Belgian theoretical physicist and philosopher of science. Professor at the Catholic University of Louvain (UCLouvain), he works on renormalization group and nonlinear differential equations. Since 2004, He is a member of the Division of Sciences of the Royal Academy of Belgium.

Bricmont is mostly known to the non-academic audience as a rationalist activist who partners with American intellectuals with similar views. He has notably criticized postmodernist views of science along with Alan Sokal, with whom he wrote Fashionable Nonsense (1997). He has also criticized imperialism and defended freedom of expression, adopting a position on the issue similar to that of Noam Chomsky.

Jean Bricmont was president of the Association française pour l'information scientifique from 2001 to 2006.

Books
 Impérialisme humanitaire (2005) published in English as Humanitarian Imperialism, 2006
 Preface to L'Atlas alternatif – Frédéric Delorca (ed), Pantin, Temps des Cerises, 2006
 Raison contre pouvoir. Le pari de Pascal Jean Bricmont and Noam Chomsky, 5 November 2009
 La République des censeurs, L'Herne. 2014. .

References

External links 
 Profile at Université catholique de Louvain (UCLouvain)
 Emeritus Professor Jean Bricmont
 Prof. Jean Bricmont (archived version, before retirement)
 
 

1952 births
Living people
Belgian physicists
Université catholique de Louvain alumni
Academic staff of the Université catholique de Louvain
Critics of postmodernism
Philosophers of science
21st-century Belgian philosophers
Continental philosophers
Members of the Royal Academy of Belgium
Free speech activists